The 1997 Welsh International Open was a women's tennis tournament played on outdoor clay courts in Cardiff in Wales that was part of Tier IV of the 1997 WTA Tour. The tournament was held from May 13 through May 18, 1997.

Winners

Women's singles

 Virginia Ruano-Pascual defeated  Alexia Dechaume-Balleret 6–1, 3–6, 6–2
 It was Ruano-Pascual's only title of the year and the 1st of her career.

Women's doubles

 Debbie Graham /  Kerry-Anne Guse defeated  Julie Pullin /  Lorna Woodroffe 6–3, 6–4
 It was Graham's only title of the year and the 5th of her career. It was Guse's 2nd title of the year and the 5th of her career.

 
Welsh International Open
Welsh International Open